The Beginning and the End (Columbia Records, 1973) is a Clifford Brown compilation album. The album opens with two tracks that Clifford Brown recorded with Chris Powell's Blue Flames in 1952, and ends with recordings of a session held at Music City Club in Philadelphia in 1956. According to the liner notes, they are "The first and last recorded performances of one of the greatest soloists in the history of Jazz." According to Nick Catalano's biography of Clifford Brown, the Music City Club session could have taken place on May 31, 1955.

Reception and legacy
The AllMusic reviewer concluded that "Clifford Brown's playing on this date is so memorable that the LP is essential for all jazz collections." Fellow trumpeter Christian Scott said that as a child he heard the album and thought that Brown "had a lot of heart and was compassionate". Returning to the album much later, he realised that Brown "was playing some pretty impossible things on the instrument [...] There's stuff that this guy did with the instrument that many fifty year old trumpet players would never attempt".

Track listing
"I Come from Jamaica" (Chris Powell)  – 2:39
"Ida Red" (Chris Powell)  – 2:00
"Walkin'" (Richard Carpenter)  – 11:38
"A Night in Tunisia" (Dizzy Gillespie) – 11:04
"Donna Lee" (Charlie Parker) – 7:11

Personnel
Clifford Brown – trumpet (all tracks)
Tracks 1–2
Chris Powell – vocals, percussion
Vance Wilson – alto saxophone, tenor saxophone
Eddie Lambert – guitar
Duke Wells – piano
James Johnson – bass
Osie Johnson – drums
Tracks 3–5
Billy Root – tenor saxophone
Ziggy Vines – tenor saxophone
Sam Dockery – piano
Adolph "Ace" Tisone – bass
Ellis Tollin – drums

References

1973 albums
Clifford Brown albums
Columbia Records albums
Bebop albums
Hard bop albums